The Order of Idris I (Nishan al-Idris) was founded by Sayyid Muhammad Idris as-Senussi, Emir of Cyrenaica, in 1947. The Emir later became King Idris I in December 1951, when the United Kingdom of Libya was established. The Order was awarded in two classes, namely Grand Collar, which is reserved for Kings and Heads of State, and Grand Cordon, which is reserved for consorts of Heads of State, princes and princesses and members of royal families.

It continues as a dynastic order.

Orders, decorations, and medals of Libya
Awards established in 1947
1947 establishments in Libya